Dichomeris cuspis is a moth in the family Gelechiidae. It was described by Kyu-Tek Park in 1994. It is found in south-eastern Siberia, Korea and Shaanxi, China.

The length of the forewings is 7.2-7.7 mm. The forewings are uniform dark fuscous, shining blue leaden metallic with a dash-shaped yellowish-white strigula at three-fourths on the anterior margin. The hindwings are dark grey.

The larvae feed on Quercus acuteserrata.

References

Moths described in 1994
cuspis